Unreleased may refer to:

Unreleased (Andre Nickatina album), 2001
Unreleased (No-Big-Silence album), 2003
Unreleased (1998–2010), an album by Powderfinger, 2020
Groupees Unreleased EP, or Unreleased, by Celldweller, 2011
 Unreleased, an EP by Nicole Dollanganger, 2014
Unreleased stop, in phonetics, a plosive consonant without an audible release burst

See also